Matej Vidović (born April 14, 1993 in Zagreb, Croatia) is a Croatian alpine skier, a slalom specialist. He competed for Croatia at the 2014 Winter Olympics in the slalom event, finishing 28th.

References

External links
 
 
 
 
 

1993 births
Living people
Croatian male alpine skiers
Olympic alpine skiers of Croatia
Alpine skiers at the 2014 Winter Olympics
Alpine skiers at the 2018 Winter Olympics
Alpine skiers at the 2022 Winter Olympics
Sportspeople from Zagreb